David Simpson (born 31 March 1963) is  a former Australian rules footballer who played with Richmond in the Victorian Football League (VFL).

Notes

External links 
		

1963 births
Living people
Australian rules footballers from Victoria (Australia)
Richmond Football Club players